Caina deletella is a species of snout moth. It was described by Émile Louis Ragonot in 1893. It is found in southern Iraq in the Persian Gulf region, Pune in India, Malta as well as the Canary Islands.

References

Moths described in 1893
Phycitinae
Taxa named by Émile Louis Ragonot